Yeoroo Lee (born October 5, 2006) is a  Korean-American racing driver. He currently competes in the U.S. F2000 National Championship with Jay Howard Driver Development.

Racing record

Career summary 

*Season still in progress.

American open-wheel racing results

U.S. F2000 National Championship 
(key) (Races in bold indicate pole position) (Races in italics indicate fastest lap) (Races with * indicate most race laps led)

*Season still in progress.

References 

2006 births
Living people
Racing drivers from New Jersey
U.S. F2000 National Championship drivers
People from Fair Lawn, New Jersey